"Tell Me Something" is a song by Australian band Indecent Obsession. The song was released as the second single from their debut album Spoken Words (1989). The song peaked at number 17 on the Australian ARIA Chart.

Early in 1990, "Tell Me Something" peaked at No. 31 on the Billboard Hot 100 and No. 91 in the United Kingdom.

Track listing
 7" single (102091-7)
 "Tell Me Something"	
 "Why Do People Fall in Love"

 12" single
 "Tell Me Something" (Dance Mix)	
 "Tell Me Something" (Extended Mix)

 Minidisc (Japan)
 "Tell Me Something"	
 "Never Really Loved You" (Live)

 UK single
 "Tell Me Something" (7" Version) - 3:54
 "Never Really Loved You" (Live) - 3:19
 "Tell Me Something" (The Decent Mix) - 4:16

Chart performance

See also
 List of 1990s one-hit wonders in the United States

References

External links
 "Tell Me Something" by Indecent Obsession

1989 singles
1989 songs
Indecent Obsession songs
MCA Records singles